Elections for the members of the National Assembly were held on September 16, 1935 pursuant to the Tydings–McDuffie Act, which established the Commonwealth of the Philippines. The leaders of the ruling Nacionalista Party, Manuel Quezon and Sergio Osmeña reconciled and became running mates in the presidential election but their supporters, the Democraticos and the Democrata Pro-Independencias respectively, effectively were two separate parties at the National Assembly elections.

With the Senate abolished, the National Assembly became a unicameral legislature.

Results

References

  

1935
History of the Philippines (1898–1946)
1935 elections in the Philippines